USS K-5 (SS-36) was a K-class submarine of the United States Navy.  Her keel was laid down by the Fore River Shipbuilding Company in Quincy, Massachusetts, under a subcontract from the Electric Boat Company of Groton, Connecticut.  She was launched on 17 March 1914 sponsored by Mrs.  Warren G. Child, and commissioned on 22 August.

Service history
K-5 departed Boston, Massachusetts, on 16 November for Newport, Rhode Island, where she joined 4th Division, Atlantic Torpedo Flotilla, for experiments and exercises to develop the techniques of submarine warfare. She operated for almost three years along the Atlantic coast from New England to the Gulf of Mexico conducting underwater maneuvers, undergoing diving and torpedo firing practice, and training submariners.

She departed New London, Connecticut, on 12 October 1917, for duty in the Atlantic Ocean. As the first U. S. submarine to cruise European waters during the war, they operated out of the Azores searching for enemy U-boats and surface raiders. K-5 continued this duty until 18 April 1918, when she headed home via Bermuda and Hampton Roads, Virginia, arriving Philadelphia, Pennsylvania, on 16 May. Proceeding to New London, Connecticut, on 27 September, she departed for Key West, Florida, on 7 January 1919, to resume development operations.

K-5 operated in the Gulf of Mexico out of Key West and New Orleans, Louisiana. After cruising the Mississippi River to St. Louis, Missouri, she sailed from New Orleans 27 July 1919, for operations between Key West, and Havana, Cuba. K-5 departed Key West for Philadelphia 12 June 1920, arriving 17 June for overhaul.

Repairs completed, she sailed to Hampton Roads, Virginia, 5 March 1921 to continue coastal operations. For almost two years she ranged the eastern seaboard from Cape Cod to the Florida Keys, participating in numerous experiments and maneuvers to improve the operations and tactical abilities of the submarine. Following diving trials off Cape Cod, K-5 arrived Hampton Roads 7 September 1922. She continued operations in the Chesapeake Bay, then decommissioned at Hampton Roads 20 February 1923. Taken in tow to Philadelphia 13 November 1924, she was struck from the Naval Vessel Register on 18 December 1930. She was sold for scrapping 3 June 1931.

Notes

References

External links
 

United States K-class submarines
World War I submarines of the United States
Ships built in Quincy, Massachusetts
1914 ships